Johannes Göderz (born 27 November 1988 in Kobern-Gondorf) is a German football player, who plays for FC Karbach.

He played for TuS Koblenz. He made his debut on the professional league level in the 2. Bundesliga for TuS Koblenz on 4 May 2008, when he came on as a substitute in the 75th minute in a game against SV Wehen Wiesbaden.

References

External links
 

1988 births
Living people
German footballers
TuS Koblenz players
2. Bundesliga players
Association football midfielders
TuS Mayen players